Pondosa may refer to the following places in the United States:
 
Pondosa, California, unincorporated community in Siskiyou County, California
Pondosa, Oregon, unincorporated community in Union County, Oregon